The men's 800 metres event at the 1961 Summer Universiade was held at the Vasil Levski National Stadium in Sofia, Bulgaria, in September 1961.

Medalists

Results

Heats

Semifinals

Final

References

Athletics at the 1961 Summer Universiade
1961